The  was the first undersea tunnel in Japan. It goes underneath the Kanmon Straits, connecting the islands of Honshu and Kyushu. It is an important link in the Japanese rail network. Its construction began in 1936, and it was completed in November 1942, during the Pacific War.

Near the end of the Pacific War the Allies planned to blow up the two tunnels with 50,000 pounds of explosives as part of the invasion of Japan. The Office of Strategic Services trained 250 of its agents for the task, but the surrender of Japan occurred before they were needed.

The Kyushu Railway Company (JR Kyushu) assumed ownership of this tunnel following the breakup of the Japanese National Railways system in 1987.

Coordinates
 Shimonoseki entrance:  
 Moji entrance:

See also
 Shin-Kanmon Tunnel for the high-speed railway
 Kanmon Road Tunnel

References 

Kyushu Railway Company
Railway tunnels in Japan
Sanyō Main Line
Undersea tunnels in Asia